The Museum of the History and Reconstruction of Ulan-Bator is a museum dedicated to the history of Ulan-Bator, the capital of Mongolia. The museum building, a landmark of early 20th century Mongolian architecture, is located in Ulan-Bator, in the Düüreg of Bayanzürkh.

History of the building 
The building was originally built by a Russian merchant, the Buryat, Tsogto Garmayevich Badmazhapov in 1904, for his personal use. From July to August 1921, the Mongolian People's Republic's Central Committee, government and combined staff were located here, with Damdin Sükhbaatar in residence. In the 1930s, the building housed the embassy of the Tuvan People's Republic, and it was subsequently converted into a Museum for Sükhbaatar. However, in 1953, after the death of Khorloogiin Choibalsan, and the adoption of a resolution to establish a joint museum for Sükhbaatar and Choibalsan, the building was converted into a printing house.

Museum of Ulan-Batar 
The first exhibition opened on 9 July 1956 and was dedicated to the history of Ulan-Batar. In 1960, a resolution of the Central Committee of the Mongolian People's Republic made the exhibition permanent and relocated it to the current building, establishing the building as the museum of the city's history. In 1970, by a resolution of the Council of Ministers, the museum was placed under protection as a site of architectural significance. 

The museum covers the history of Ulan-Batar from the time of Zanabazar to the present day. In total, the museum contains 134 documents, 224 silver objects, 30 archaeological finds, 16 geological charts, 132 historical exhibits, 335 pictures, 77 printed boards and models, 54 drawings, diagrams and plans, 898 photographs, 36 albums, 1883 slides, negatives and diafilms, 27 audio and video records, 62 commemorative items, and 234 books: in total 3,832 accessioned objects.

On International Museum Day (18 May), Children's Day (1 June), the city's birthday (26 October) and Independence Day (26 December), the museum's entrance fee is waived.

References 

Museums in Mongolia
Museums established in 1960
Buildings and structures in Ulaanbaatar